"On the Situation of Theatre and Cinema" designates a thirty-minute speech by Bahram Beyzai given in the evening of October 12, 1977 in the premises of the German Cultural Institute, Tehran. A SAVAK report estimated that about eight thousand constituted its audience. The text as well as the voice of this speech was subsequently published numerous times and came to be among the best-known discourses on freedom of speech and censorship in Iran.

The Goethe Poetry Nights of 1977 was held by the Writers' Association of Iran, and Beyzai, as a founding member of the association, delivered this speech on the third night, a rainy Wednesday evening.

References

External links 

1970s essays
1977 speeches
Censorship in Iran
Cinema of Iran
Essays about film
Essays by Bahram Beyzai
Events relating to freedom of expression
Freedom of speech in Iran
History of civil rights and liberties in Iran
Speeches by Bahram Beyzai
Theatre in Iran
Works about censorship